Tallagudem is a village in Eluru district of the Indian state of Andhra Pradesh. It is located in Pedapadu mandal of Eluru revenue division.

Demographics 

 Census of India, Tallagudem had a population of 568. The total population constitute, 285  males and 283 females with a sex ratio of 993 females per 1000 males. 60 children are in the age group of 0–6 years with sex ratio of 1400. The average literacy rate stands at 67.91%.

References 

Villages in Eluru district